Arenarius may refer to:
 in ancient Rome, the class of people performing in the arena, see Arenarius (Rome)
 an alternate title of The Sand Reckoner

See also
 Arenaria (disambiguation)
 Arenarium